MKV may refer to:

 .mkv, a filename extension for the Matroska multimedia container format
 Mittelschüler-Kartellverband, an Austrian male fraternity organization
 Multiple Kill Vehicle, U.S. missile defense program
 Mavea language, ISO 639-3 language code mkv

See also 
 Mark V (disambiguation), abbreviated as Mk V